Giuseppe Tuffanelli is a former Italian racing driver. He participated in twelve races between 1930 and 1937, most of which were Mille Miglia.

Complete results

References
 Racing Sports Cars
 Formula2.net
 Formula2.net
 Teamdan.com
 Teamdan.com

Year of birth unknown
Italian racing drivers
Mille Miglia drivers